= Hefei Feicui TV Tower =

Building in Hefei, China

General information
- Status: Under construction
- Location: Hefei, China

Height
- Height: 339 m (1,112 ft)

Hefei Feicui TV Tower is a tower under construction in Hefei, China.
